The Scarlet Baroness (German: Die feuerrote Baronesse) is a 1959 West German spy thriller film directed by Rudolf Jugert and starring Dawn Addams, Joachim Fuchsberger and Wera Frydtberg.

The film's sets were designed by the art director Arne Flekstad. It was shot at the Arca-Filmstudio in Berlin.

Synopsis
During the final days of the Second World War, British intelligence sends an agent to Berlin to try to discover the secrets of Nazi Germany's nuclear weapons program.

Cast

References

Bibliography 
 Craig, Rob. American International Pictures: A Comprehensive Filmography. McFarland, 2019.

External links 
 

1959 films
West German films
German thriller films
1950s thriller films
1950s German-language films
Films directed by Rudolf Jugert
German World War II films
Films set in Berlin
Films set in the 1940s
Films about Nazi Germany
1950s German films